The Venirauto Turpial is a four-door sedan produced in Venezuela by Venirauto, a joint Venezuelan-Iranian venture.  It is named for the national bird of Venezuela.  The production plant is located in Maracay west of Caracas and has been producing vehicles since at least July, 2007.  The vehicle is based on the Kia Pride and was originally priced at Bs. 17 million (US$7,906). According to the German newspapers die Tageszeitung the plant nearly produces no cars.

References

External links
Website of manufacturer Venirauto 

Cars of Venezuela

Cars introduced in 2007